The 2003 World Table Tennis Championships was held at the Palais Omnisports de Paris-Bercy in Paris, France from May 19 to May 25, 2003. It was the 47th edition to be contested. Liebherr is the title sponsor of the Championships.

Medal summary

Medal table

Events

Finals

Men's singles 

 Werner Schlager def.  Joo Se-Hyuk, 4–2: 11–9, 11–6, 6–11, 12–10, 8–11, 12–10

Women's singles 

 Wang Nan def.  Zhang Yining, 4–3: 11–7, 11–8, 11–4, 5–11, 6–11, 8–11, 11–5

Men's doubles 

 Wang Liqin / Yan Sen def.  Wang Hao / Kong Linghui, 4–2: 11–9, 11–8, 7–11, 11–6, 8–11, 11–5

Women's doubles 

 Wang Nan / Zhang Yining def.  Guo Yue / Niu Jianfeng, 4–1: 11–7, 11–7, 7–11, 11–2, 14–12

Mixed doubles 

 Ma Lin / Wang Nan def.  Liu Guozheng / Bai Yang, 4–3: 9–11, 12–10, 0–11, 11–7, 11–9, 5–11, 11–8

References

External links 
 International Table Tennis Federation (ITTF) website
 Official database

 
World Table Tennis Championships
World Table Tennis Championships
World Table Tennis Championships
World Table Tennis Championships
Table tennis competitions in France
World Table Tennis Championships
World Table Tennis Championships